A house is a structure used for habitation by people.

House(s) may also refer to:

Arts, entertainment, and media

Fictional characters
 House, a villain in the Doctor Who episode "The Doctor's Wife"
 Gregory House, protagonist of the medical drama House
 Thomas "House" Conklin, a character in Police Academy comedy films

Films
 House (1977 film), a Japanese horror film
 House (1986 film), an American horror/comedy film by Steve Miner
 House (1995 film), a Canadian film directed by Laurie Lynd
 House!, a 2000 British comedy film
 House (2008 film), a horror film based on the novel by Frank E. Peretti and Ted Dekker

Literature
 House (novel), a 2006 Christian fiction horror novel by Frank Peretti and Ted Dekker
 House, a 1985 documentary book by Tracy Kidder
 House, one of two plays that constitute House & Garden (plays), 1999, by Alan Ayckbourn

Music and dance

Generic terms
 House band, a venue's in-house group
 House music, a style of electronic dance music
 House dance, a related form of street dance

Bands
 A House, from Dublin
 The House Band, from Edinburgh

Songs
 "House" (Patrick Wolf song), 2011
 "House" (The Psychedelic Furs song), 1989
 "Houses", by Dinosaur Jr. on Farm
 "Houses", by the Fire Theft on The Fire Theft
 "Houses", by Søren on Stargazing
 "Houses", by Judy Collins on So Early in the Spring
 "The House Song", by Peter, Paul and Mary on Album 1700

Other media
 House (TV series), an American television medical drama
 House (sculpture), a Turner-Prize-winning sculpture by Rachel Whiteread
 Auditorium, or house in theatrical jargon

Business
 Fashion house (maison couture), a business, often family-owned, which specializes in fashion design, including haute couture
 House brand, a private label brand made by the company that sells it in its own stores
 House Foods, a Japanese food manufacturer and brand
 House (brand), a clothing brand

Education
 House system, a traditional feature of schools in the Commonwealth
 House, the name for various Harvard University residences

People
 House or dynasty, a noble or royal family
 House (surname)
 Dakota House (born 1974), Canadian actor

Places

United States
 House, New Mexico, a village
 House, North Carolina, an unincorporated community

Religion and mythology
 House (astrology)
 Religious house or monastery

Other uses
 House (curling), the target in the sport of curling
 House (game), a children's role-playing game
 House (legislature), several law-making bodies
 House (operating system)
 House (steamboat), the cabin structure on a steamboat

See also
 
 
 Haus (disambiguation)
 Household
 Houses of Parliament (disambiguation)
 The House (disambiguation)